Vietri di Potenza is a town and comune in the province of Potenza, in the Basilicata region of southern Italy.

Geography
The town is bordered by Balvano, Caggiano, Picerno, Romagnano al Monte, Salvitelle and Savoia di Lucania.

References

Cities and towns in Basilicata